Opposite or Opposites may refer to:

 Opposite (semantics), a word that means the reverse of a word
 Opposite (leaf), an arrangement of leaves on a stem
 Opposite (mathematics), the negative of a number; numbers that, when added, yield zero
"The Opposite", a 1994 episode of Seinfeld

Music
 The Opposites, Dutch rap group
 Opposites (album), 2013 album by Scottish alternative rock band Biffy Clyro
 "Opposite" (song), 2013 song by Biffy Clyro
 Opposites (EP), 2010 album by Tracey Thorn
"The Opposite", 1964 song by Johnny Burnette

See also
 Opposite hitter, a position in volleyball
 Antinomy, opposites in a certain form from Kant
 
 Anti (disambiguation)
 Contrary (disambiguation)
 Flipside (disambiguation)
 Inverse (disambiguation)
 Opposite sex (disambiguation)
 Opposition (disambiguation)
 Polar opposite (disambiguation)
 The House Opposite (disambiguation)